Amirabad-e Sili Zardi (also Romanized as Amīrābād-e Sīlī Zardī; also known as Amīrābād) is a village in Kuh Mareh Sorkhi Rural District, Arzhan District, Shiraz County, Fars Province, Iran. At the 2006 census, its population was 135, in 25 families.

References 

Populated places in Shiraz County